Parashada is a genus of moths in the subfamily Arctiinae. It contains the single species Parashada truncata, which is found on the Sula Islands.

References

Natural History Museum Lepidoptera generic names catalog

Lithosiini